Mabila (also spelled Mavila, Mavilla, Maubila, or Mauvilla, as influenced by Spanish or French transliterations) was a small fortress town known to the paramount chief Tuskaloosa in 1540, in a region of present-day central Alabama.  The exact location has been debated for centuries, but southwest of present-day Selma, Alabama, is one possibility.   In late 2021, archaeologists announced  the excavation of Spanish artifacts at several Native American settlement sites in Marengo County that indicate that they have found the historical province of Mabila, although not the town itself.  They theorize that the town site is within a few miles of their excavations.

In 1540 Chief Tuskaloosa arranged for more than 2500 native warriors to be concealed at Mabila,  prepared to attack a large party of foreign invaders in the Mississippian culture territory: Spanish explorer Hernando de Soto and his expedition.

When Hernando de Soto first met Tuskaloosa at his home village and asked him for supplies, Tuskaloosa advised them to travel to another of his towns, known as Mabila, where supplies would be waiting. A native messenger was sent ahead to Mabila. When Tuskaloosa arrived with the first group of Spaniards, he asked the Spanish people to leave the settlement and territory. A fight broke out between a soldier and a native, and many warriors emerged from hiding in houses and began shooting arrows at the Spaniards. The Spaniards fled, leaving their possessions inside the fortress.  The conflict that resulted is called the Battle of Mabila. Armed with guns, the Spaniards eventually burned down the village and killed most of the warriors.

Fortress town
The walled compound of Mabila, one of many encountered by the Spaniards in their exploration, was enclosed in a thick stuccoed wall, 16.5-ft (5-m) high. It was made from wide tree trunks tied with cross-beams and covered with mud/straw stucco, to appear as a solid wall. The fortress was defended by Muskogee warriors, who shot arrows or threw stones.

Based on the earlier sources, Garcilaso de la Vega described the town of Mabila as:

Battle of Mabila
The Spaniards suffered their greatest losses of the De Soto Expedition during the battle at Mabila, but the Mississippians suffered even more grievous losses. De Soto had demanded supplies, bearers, and women from the powerful Chief Tuskaloosa, when they met him at his main town. He said they needed to go to another settlement, and took them to Mabila. 

On October 18, 1540, de Soto and the expedition arrived at Mabila, a heavily fortified village situated on a plain. It had a wooden palisade encircling it, with bastions placed so that archers could shoot their longbows to cover the approaches. Upon arriving at Mabila, the Spaniards knew something was amiss. The population of the town was almost exclusively male- young warriors and men of status. There were several women, but no children. The Spaniards also noticed the palisade had been recently strengthened, and that all trees, bushes, and weeds, had been cleared from outside the settlement for the length of a crossbow shot. Outside the palisade, they saw an older warrior in a field, who was seen exhorting younger warriors, and leading them in mock skirmishes and military exercises.

When the Spaniards reached the town of Mabila, ruled by one of Tuskaloosa's vassals, the Chief asked de Soto to allow him to remain there.  When de Soto refused, Tuskaloosa warned him to leave the town, then withdrew to another room, and refused to talk further.  A lesser chief was asked to intercede, but he would not. One of the Spaniards, according to Elvas, "seized him by the cloak of marten-skins that he had on, drew it off over his head, and left it in his hands; whereupon, the Indians all beginning to rise, he gave him a stroke with a cutlass, that laid open his back, when they, with loud yells, came out of the houses, discharging their bows."

The Spaniards barely escaped from the well-fortified town. The Indians closed the gates and "beating their drums, they raised flags, with great shouting."  De Soto determined to attack the town, and in the battle that followed, Elvas records: "The Indians fought with so great spirit that they, many times, drove our people back out of the town. The struggle lasted so long that many Catholics, weary and very thirsty, went to drink at a pond nearby, tinged with the blood of the killed, and returned to the combat."

De Soto had his men set fire to the town, then by Elvas's account,
 "breaking in upon the Indians and beating them down, they fled out of the place, the cavalry and infantry driving them back through the gates, where losing the hope of escape, they fought valiantly; and the Catholics getting among them with cutlasses, they found themselves met on all sides by their strokes, when many, dashing headlong into the flaming houses, were smothered, and, heaped one upon another, burned to death.

 "They who perished there were in all two thousand five hundred, a few more or less: of the Catholics there fell two hundred... Of the living, one hundred and fifty (150) Catholics had received seven hundred wounds..."

Elvas noted later that four hundred hogs died in the conflagration. The exact count of the dead is not known, but Spanish accounts at the time estimated the Indian dead at between 2,500 and 3,000. This range would make the battle one of the bloodiest in recorded North American history.

See also
List of sites and peoples visited by the Hernando de Soto Expedition

Notes

References
 Sylvia Flowers, "DeSoto's Expedition", U.S. National Park Service, 2007, webpage: NPS-DeSoto.

South Appalachian Mississippian culture
Native American history of Alabama
Spanish conquests in the Americas
Choctaw
C